The 1872 United States presidential election in Texas was held on November 5, 1872, as part of the 1872 United States presidential election. State voters chose eight electors to represent the state in the Electoral College, which chose the president and vice president.

Texas voted for the Liberal Republican nominee Horace Greeley, who received 57% of the vote. Greeley died before Congress could certify the results, leaving Texas electors (and the electors of five other states) free to vote for whoever they chose. All 8 electors voted for Thomas A. Hendricks.

This was the first presidential election since 1860 that Texas participated in. It had seceded from the United States in March 1861 and joined the Confederate States of America during the American Civil War. It would not participate in the following elections in 1864 and 1868 and would not be readmitted into the Union until 1870.

This was the first presidential election in Texas in which the Republican nominee was on the ballot. Incumbent President Ulysses S. Grant finished a respectable second with over 40% of the vote, which ultimately stood as the best performance for a Republican candidate for over half a century until Republican Herbert Hoover won the state in 1928 as part of anti-Catholic surge against Democratic nominee Al Smith. It also remains one of the best performances by a losing Republican in Texas, with only Richard Nixon in 1960 and Gerald Ford in 1976 outperforming Grant's 40.71%.

Results

See also
 United States presidential elections in Texas

Footnotes

References

1872
Texas
1872 Texas elections